Hassan Hassan (born 1982) is an American author and journalist of Syrian origin. He co-wrote the 2015 New York Times bestseller ISIS: Inside the Army of Terror with Michael Weiss. He has written on Islamist groups in the Middle East. He frequently appeared on The O'Reilly Factor, Amanpour and The Last Word with Lawrence O'Donnell, and has written for The New York Times, Foreign Policy, The Guardian, The Atlantic, Foreign Affairs, Financial Times, and The Daily Beast, among others.

Background
Hassan is from the town of Al-Shaafah in Al-Bukamal District, Deir ez-Zor Governorate, in eastern Syria near the Iraqi border. In 1996, he moved from ash-Sha'fa to the city of Al Bukamal for high school. In 2000, he moved to Damascus to study English literature at Damascus University. In 2006, he moved to the United Kingdom, where he completed an MA in International relations at the University of Nottingham. After graduation, he moved to the United Arab Emirates in 2008 to work as a journalist for The National newspaper, covering domestic and Gulf affairs. He covered the Syrian conflict since the uprising began in 2011. His research on the Islamic State of Iraq and the Levant (ISIL) included extensive interviews with members of the organization since its rise in his home region in June 2014.

Career
His book on the rise of the militant group ISIL was chosen by The Wall Street Journal as one of 10 must-read works on the evolution of terrorism in the Middle East, one of the London Times Best Books of 2015, and The New York Times Editors' Choice in April 2015. The book was reviewed favorably twice by The New York Times. Times chief book critic, Michiko Kakutani, said the book gave readers "a fine-grained look at the organization’s evolution through assorted incarnations."

Hassan studies Sunni and Shia militant organizations, as well as Iraq, Syria, and the Persian Gulf. His research was commissioned by Carnegie Endowment for International Peace, European Council on Foreign Relations, Chatham House, Royal United Services Institute, Brookings Institution, and University of Oxford's Gulf studies forum.

Hassan is currently a director at the Center for Global Policy, a think tank in Washington D.C. He previously worked as an associate fellow at Chatham House a senior fellow at the Tahrir Institute for Middle East Policy, and a weekly columnist for The National newspaper in Abu Dhabi, United Arab Emirates. He advises officials in the United States and the Middle East.

In June 2016, Hassan testified before the Senate Homeland Security and Governmental Affairs Committee on the extremist ideology of ISIL, a widely covered hearing. In February 2017, he testified before the House Foreign Affairs Committee on defeating terrorism in Syria.

On December 24, 2019, Hassan published his translation of a speech of Abu Mohammad al-Julani, the commander-in-chief of the Syrian militant group Tahrir al-Sham, the successor organisation of the Syrian branch of al-Qaeda.

References

External links
 Goodreads
 Google books
 Amazon
 Carnegie Endowment for International Peace
 

Syrian non-fiction writers
Living people
1982 births
Place of birth missing (living people)
Syrian journalists
Alumni of the University of Nottingham
Syrian emigrants to the United States
Damascus University alumni